M10, M-10 or M 10 may refer to:

Science and technology
 Messier 10, a globular cluster in the constellation Ophiuchus
 M10, a Garmin Nüvifone smartphone
 Samsung Galaxy M10, a smartphone
 M10, a rocket engine in development by Avio

Transportation

Bus routes
 M10 (New York City bus), a New York City Bus route in Manhattan, US
 M10 (New York City bus franchise), a New York City Bus route in Manhattan, US now named M21

Rail lines
 M10 (Istanbul Metro), Turkey

Roads
 M10 motorway (Great Britain), a former designation for a motorway in Hertfordshire, England
 M-10 (Michigan highway), a road in Michigan
M10 (East London), a Metropolitan Route in East London, South Africa
M10 (Cape Town), a Metropolitan Route in Cape Town, South Africa
M10 (Johannesburg), a Metropolitan Route in Johannesburg, South Africa
M10 (Pretoria), a Metropolitan Route in Pretoria, South Africa
M10 (Durban), a Metropolitan Route in Durban, South Africa
M10 (Bloemfontein), a Metropolitan Route in Bloemfontein, South Africa
M10 (Port Elizabeth), a Metropolitan Route in Port Elizabeth, South Africa
M10 (Pietermaritzburg), a Metropolitan Route in Pietermaritzburg, South Africa
 M10 motorway (Pakistan), a road located in Sindh province
 M10 highway (Russia), a road connecting Saint Petersburg and Moscow
 Highway M10 (Ukraine), a road in Ukraine
 M10 Road (Zambia), a road in Zambia

Vehicles and engines
 BMW M10, an I4 piston engine produced from 1961 to 1987
 Mooney M10 Cadet, an aircraft once produced by the Mooney Airplane company
 Noble M10, a British sports car built by Noble Automotive Ltd

Firearms and military
 M10 tank destroyer, a US tank destroyer used in World War II
 152-mm howitzer M1938 (M-10), a Soviet howitzer used in World War II
 MAC-10, a machine pistol manufactured in the US
 Remington Model 10, a US WWI-era pump-action shotgun
 M10, a modern rifle based on the No. 4 action produced in Australia
 M.10, a German World War I prototype base for one of the two Fokker B.II
 M10, a scabbard for the M7 bayonet

Other uses
 M10 (political party), in Romania
 M10, a screw thread gauge
 Magic 2010, the eleventh core set in Magic: The Gathering
 M10 (panel building), a high rise apartment building type in East Germany
 M10, a difficulty grade in mixed climbing

See also
 Model 10 (disambiguation)
 M2010 Enhanced Sniper Rifle
 M1910 (disambiguation)
 MX (disambiguation)